Mon Keang School is a Chinese language school located in the Wong Benevolent Association Building at 121 East Pender Street, in the Chinatown of Vancouver, British Columbia.

History 
The school was first established on the third floor of the Wong Benevolent Association Building in 1925., providing lessons in Chinese cultural customs and language, particularly Cantonese, to Canadian-born children of Chinese descent.

By 1937, the Mon Keang School was one of ten Chinese language schools in Vancouver, with classes at these schools funded primarily by groups such as family associations, the Chinese Freemasons, and churches. Like all of the other schools at the time, the Mon Keang School only offered elementary-level language classes until after World War II, when it became the first school to provide language classes at the secondary level. Instructors at the school were mainly from China, who were only allowed to immigrate under exemptions from the Chinese Immigration Act, 1923 (now known as the Chinese Exclusion Act) in effect at the time.

Wong Kown Fow, a teacher and principal at Mon Keang School from 1936 to 1969, noted that the school officially used Cantonese to teach its students, but many of its instructors also used a mixture of both Cantonese and Toisanese.

In 2011, the school officially closed and stopped offering classes due to declining enrolment.

In 2016, the Youth Collaborative for Chinatown - 青心在唐人街, a grassroots youth group based in Vancouver's Chinatown, began organizing Saturday School, a series of place-based Cantonese language learning classes that take place in the classrooms at the Mon Keang School and through field studies and trips to various other locations in Chinatown

Building history 
The school is housed in the Wong Benevolent Association Building, located on East Pender Street, on its third floor. The building was originally constructed in 1910, but underwent several renovations over years, including some designed by Chinese-Canadian architect W.H. Chow, G. A. Southall, and later by J.A. Radford in 1921.

References 

Schools in Vancouver
Chinese-language schools
Chinese-Canadian culture in Vancouver
1925 establishments in British Columbia